The 1995–96 FA Premier League (known as the FA Carling Premiership for sponsorship reasons) was the fourth season of the competition, since its formation in 1992. Due to the decision to reduce the number of clubs in the Premier League from 22 to 20, only two clubs were promoted instead of the usual three, Middlesbrough and Bolton Wanderers.

Manchester United won the Premier League and qualified for the UEFA Champions League, while Arsenal, Aston Villa, and Newcastle United qualified for the UEFA Cup. Liverpool also qualified for the UEFA Cup Winners' Cup as runners-up of the FA Cup which was won by Manchester United.

Summary
Liverpool and Aston Villa emerged as possible title contenders early in the season, while Middlesbrough's early promise saw them occupy fourth place in late October, but an injury crisis saw their league form slump, and they could only manage a 12th-place finish. Most of the campaign was a two-horse race between Manchester United and Newcastle United. The two sides played on 27 December, with Newcastle 10 points ahead in the league. A 2–0 home win for Manchester United cut the gap to seven points, and two days later they beat Queens Park Rangers 2–1 to reduce the gap to just four points. But a 4–1 defeat at Tottenham on New Year's Day and a 0–0 draw with Aston Villa allowed Newcastle to establish a 12-point lead in January.

Manchester United and Newcastle met again in early March, and a goal by Eric Cantona gave Manchester United a 1–0 away win and cut the gap to a single point. With one game left of the season, Manchester United led the Premier League by two points, having taken lead of the league halfway through March and stayed on top ever since. In case of the two clubs being tied for first place, the Premier League made preliminary preparations for a championship play-off match at Wembley. For Newcastle to win their first title since 1927, they had to win against Tottenham and hope that Middlesbrough beat their Mancunian rivals. But the Premier League title went to Old Trafford as Manchester United won 3–0 and Newcastle could only manage a 1–1 draw with Tottenham.

Despite the arrival of Dennis Bergkamp, Arsenal never looked like serious title challengers, their best chance of success coming in the League Cup, where they reached the semi-finals, losing on away goals to Aston Villa. However, the North London side still qualified for the UEFA Cup by finishing fifth.

Aston Villa won the Coca-Cola sponsored League Cup competition this season, beating Leeds United 3–0 at Wembley.

Title holders Blackburn recorded the lowest ever finish by a Premier League title-holder by finishing 7th. This record was matched by Manchester United in 2013–14 and broken by Chelsea in 2015–16 and again by Leicester City in 2016–17.

Six days after clinching their third league title in four seasons, Manchester United became the first team to complete a second league championship and FA Cup double when a Cantona goal gave them a 1–0 win over Liverpool in the FA Cup final.

The Premier League relegation places went to Bolton Wanderers, Queens Park Rangers and Manchester City. Bolton had spent a large proportion of their first Premier League season bottom of the table. Manchester City failed to beat Liverpool on the final day of the season, consigning them to the final relegation place on goal difference behind Southampton and Coventry City.

English performance in European competition
Blackburn Rovers, the 1994–95 Premier League champions, finished bottom of their group in the UEFA Champions League. Manchester United were knocked out of the UEFA Cup in the first round, with Liverpool and Leeds United both being knocked out at the second round. Everton were beaten in the second round of the UEFA Cup Winners' Cup. The only English team still in European competition after Christmas were Nottingham Forest, who reached the quarter-finals of the UEFA Cup.

Teams
Twenty teams competed in the league – the top eighteen teams from the previous season and the two teams promoted from the First Division. The promoted teams were Middlesbrough and Bolton Wanderers, returning to the top flight after two and fifteen years respectively. This was also Bolton Wanderers' first season in the Premier League. They replaced Crystal Palace, Norwich City, Leicester City and Ipswich Town, ending their top flight spells of one, nine, one and three years respectively. Starting from this season, twenty teams contested in the Premier League as opposed to previous seasons with twenty-two teams.

Stadiums and locations

Personnel and kits
(as of 5 May 1996)

Managerial changes

League table

Results

Season statistics

Scoring

Top scorers

Hat-tricks 

Note: 4 Player scored 4 goals; (H) – Home; (A) – Away

Top assists

Awards

Monthly awards

Annual awards

See also
1995–96 in English football

References and notes

External links
League and cup results for all the 1995/96 Premier Division clubs at footballsite
1995–96 Premier League Season at RSSSF

 
Premier League seasons
Eng
1995–96 in English football leagues